Diepholz – Nienburg I is an electoral constituency (German: Wahlkreis) represented in the Bundestag. It elects one member via first-past-the-post voting. Under the current constituency numbering system, it is designated as constituency 33. It is located in central Lower Saxony, comprising the Diepholz district and parts of the Nienburg district.

Diepholz – Nienburg I was created for the inaugural 1949 federal election. Since 2009, it has been represented by Axel Knoerig of the Christian Democratic Union (CDU).

Geography
Diepholz – Nienburg I is located in central Lower Saxony. As of the 2021 federal election, it comprises the entirety of the Diepholz district as well as the Samtgemeinden of Grafschaft Hoya and Uchte from the Nienburg district.

History
Diepholz – Nienburg I was created in 1949, then known as Diepholz – Melle – Wittlage. In the 1965 through 1976 elections, it was named Nienburg. From 1980 through 1998, it was named Diepholz. It acquired its current name in the 2002 election. In the inaugural Bundestag election, it was Lower Saxony constituency 23 in the numbering system. From 1953 through 1961, it was number 45. From 1965 through 1976, it was number 34. From 1980 through 1998, it was number 28. From 2002 through 2009, it was number 34. Since 2013, it has been constituency 33.

Originally, the constituency comprised the districts of Grafschaft Diepholz, Melle, and Wittlage. It also included part of the Nienburg district, specifically the territory which now comprises the Samtgemeinde of Uchte. In the 1965 election, the entirety of the Nienburg district was transferred to the constituency. In the 1980 election, the area of the abolished Melle and Wittlage districts was transferred away, as was the Nienburg district. From then until 2002, the constituency comprised only the district of Diepholz. It acquired its current borders in the 2002 election.

Members
The constituency was first held by Rudolf Eickhoff of the German Party (DP), who served from 1949 until 1957. He was succeeded by Karl Gossel of the Christian Democratic Union (CDU), who served two terms. Fellow CDU members Günter von Nordenskjöld (1965–72) and Richard Ey (1972–80) then each served two terms. In 1980, the Social Democratic Party (SPD) won the constituency, and Peter Würtz was its representative for a single term. The CDU's Walter Link regained it in 1983, and served until 1998. In 1998, the SPD's Detlev von Larcher won, and served a single term. Rolf Kramer of the SPD was representative from 2002 to 2009. Axel Knoerig of the CDU has served as representative since 2009.

Election results

2021 election

2017 election

2013 election

2009 election

References

Federal electoral districts in Lower Saxony
1949 establishments in West Germany
Constituencies established in 1949